The Castilla y León Iberians is  a professional Spanish rugby union team based in the Castilla y León region. They compete annually in the Rugby Europe Super Cup. Their motto is "We are Iberians". Their homeground is Estadio Pepe Rojo, Valladolid.

History 
The franchise was founded in 2021 as the Spanish representative in the Rugby Europe Super Cup. The Castilla y Leon Iberians is made up of the clubs from the Castile and León Rugby División de Honor, thus bringing together VRAC, El Salvador, and the University of Burgos (UBU) teams.

The Rugby Europe Super Cup competition features 8 teams or franchises in two groups or "conferences", which is played in a Round Robin format. At the end of the two rounds, the two best teams from each conference participated in the final phase.

During 2021 the Western Conference included the Brussels Devils of Belgium, the Delta of the Netherlands, the Lusitanos of Portugal, and the Castilla y Leon Iberians.

The Iberians qualified for the semi-finals, losing to the Black Lion 43-40 at Avchala Stadium.

The Rugby Europe Super Cup 2022 saw the Iberians in the semi-finals losing again to the Black Lion 41-9.

Home Ground 
Estadio Pepe Rojo is located in the city of Valladolid, Spain. It is also the home ground of CR El Salvador and Valladolid RAC. The sports complex consists of five rugby fields (Field no.1 - main field; Field no.2; field no.3 - 'track and field'; field no.4 and field no. 5, - 'artificial grass' ), of which the no. 1 y no. 2 are used regularly for first-grade official competition.

The No. 1 field, which is the main field of the complex, has a roofed grandstand with seats at the west end, as well as a unroofed stand at the east end, with also a small stand at the north end, with the west stand being refurbished and expanded and the south end was built in 2016 (the stadium records big attendances when both teams play the local derby or a championship final). With this refurbishment it was possible to expand the capacity of Pepe Rojo to 1.150 seats, thus, reaching the amount of 6.000 seats in the No.1 field.

Current squad

 

    

 

 Senior 15s internationally capped players are listed in bold.

See also
 Spain national rugby union team
 Rugby union in Spain
 Olympus Rugby XV Madrid

External links
 Official website

References

Spanish rugby union teams
Rugby clubs established in 2021
2021 establishments in Spain
Sport in Valladolid
Rugby Europe Super Cup